"C.E.D'oh" is the fifteenth episode of the fourteenth season of the American animated television series The Simpsons. It first aired on the Fox network in the United States on March 16, 2003.

Plot
A sleepy Marge is too tired on Valentine's Day to have sex with an eager and well-prepared Homer, who dejectedly leaves the house. He sees a billboard for a school offering extension courses. He goes to the school and attempts to take a course on stripping for his wife, which Dr. Hibbert teaches, but is kicked out for hogging the stripping oil. By accident, Homer winds up in a different class that teaches strategies for workplace success.

Inspired by the lessons, he begins to investigate problems at the power plant and propose solutions to Mr. Burns, who rejects them all without reading them. Homer later overhears Burns state that he has made a canary the legal owner of the plant in order to avoid any consequences of wrongdoing. With help from Bart, he devises a plan to overthrow Burns by setting the canary free.

Homer tricks Burns into believing that a team of inspectors is visiting to check conditions at the plant; when Burns is unable to find the canary, he panics and names Homer as the new owner. Homer's first act is to throw Burns from the office balcony, allowing a throng of employees in the parking lot to crowd-surf him into a waiting taxi. Burns and Smithers flee to Marrakesh, Morocco, intent on purchasing a large quantity of opium.

The responsibilities of running the plant soon force Homer to spend most of his time at work instead of with the family, and he becomes miserable after having to lay off employees and listen to business analysts discuss the plant's troubles. Burns visits Homer one night (informing him that Smithers has been sentenced to 80 years in prison for drug possession) and takes him to the cemetery, showing him the graves of people whose relationships with Burns suffered because he worked so much - including his wife. Homer decides to return ownership of the plant to Burns, who drugs him into unconsciousness and begins to wall him up inside one of the cemetery crypts. However, he is so slow and weak at building the wall that Homer easily steps over the few bricks he has laid after waking up. Leaving the plant in Burns' hands, Homer returns home to have a barbecue with his family and enjoy his old life again.

Production

The live-action flipbook couch gag was actually intended for another episode but it was placed into this one instead. The couch gag director Mike Polcino hired a hand model to play the part of the animator. It was a reference to the way animators flip through recently drawn images to make sure the action flows properly. As the chosen couch gag is often dependent on the length of the episode, this relatively short one was placed into C.E.D'oh, a longer Simpsons episode than the one it was originally intended for.

The writers said that they did not want to watch characters "walking around" as it was not funny, and instead wanted them to "go from joke to joke". They however note that the entire act one closer consists of Homer wandering through town seeing things. They justify it by explaining that a "sweet romantic" mood is being built, and that a slower pace was needed.

Steve Moore posed for the scene where Snake strangles inmate Terrance, only for Homer to misinterpret it as love.

Another suggestion for Dr Hibbert's stripper name that was pitched besides "Malcolm Sex" (which made it into the episode) was "Christmas Buttocks". In this scene, where Hibbert leads a "Strip For Your Wife" seminar on Valentine's Day, the team included regulars rather than Simpson-ised extras. This led to random cameos such as Cletus and one of the mobsters.

Edwin Aguilar did all the animation for the Legoland sequence, yet he is not featured in the episode's credits.

According to Al Jean, Matt Groening pitched the joke where Homer puts a blanket over Mr Burns after his failed attempt to brick Homer up.

Cultural references
In the episode, Lenny and Carl begin to fight each other with plutonium rods, simulating lightsabers. They fight over whether The Phantom Menace or Attack of the Clones "sucked more". The prank that is pulled in American Graffiti is parodied in the Itchy & Scratchy short "Bleeder of the Pack". At the end of "Bleeder of the Pack" Scratchy is involved in an airplane crash together with Ritchie Valens, Buddy Holly and The Big Bopper, which is a reference to the tragic plane crash on February 3, 1959. Legoland is referenced when Smithers says Mr. Burns has dumped nuclear waste under it for years. The scene where Ned Flanders stares at Homer and Marge at night from his bedroom window, in the dark with the cigar lit, is a parody of Rear Window. The scene where Mr Burns attempts to brick Homer up is a satire of The Cask of Amontillado by Edgar Allan Poe. The episode ends with the theme song to the 1969-1972 show The Courtship of Eddie's Father.

The head of the "Successmanship 101" seminar, played by Hank Azaria, is a parody of Alec Baldwin's character in the film Glengarry Glen Ross.

Bart exclaims "Look at me! I'm Tomokazu Ohka of the Montreal Expos !" while playing baseball, to which Milhouse replies "Well, I'm Esteban Yan of the Tampa Bay Devil Rays!", referencing the relative obscurity of the two pitchers and their respective teams. The Expos would relocate to Washington, D.C. a year later and the Devil Rays would rebrand to the Rays four years later.

The episode title is a reference to the corporate position of Chief Executive Officer.

Also, when Dr. Hibert tells Homer to take a quarter to call his mother and tell her that he will never be a stripper, this is a reference to the movie The Paper Chase, in which Professor Kingsfield tells the Harvard Law student James Hart: "Mr. Hart, here is a dime. Take it, call your mother, and tell her there is serious doubt about you ever becoming a lawyer."

Critical reception
In 2014, The Simpsons writers picked "Bleeder of the Pack" from this episode as one of their nine favorite "Itchy & Scratchy" episodes of all time.

References

External links

The Simpsons (season 14) episodes
2003 American television episodes
Television episodes with live action and animation
Cultural depictions of Buddy Holly